Ron Taylor may refer to:

Ron Taylor (actor) (1952–2002), American actor
Ron Taylor (baseball) (born 1937), former Major League Baseball relief pitcher
Ron Taylor (diver) (1934–2012), Australian underwater diver, shark expert and film maker
Ron Taylor (footballer) (1932–2015), VFL footballer and Olympic boxer
Ron Taylor (singer), American singer
Ron Taylor (rugby league), Australian rugby league footballer
Tiny Ron Taylor (1947–2019), American film actor and basketball player
Ron Taylor (American football) (?–2014), American football coach and player
Ron Taylor (bowls), Australian bowls international